Neuronium is a Spanish electronic music group created by Michel Huygen in 1976. The official biography claims Quasar 2C361 (1977) to be the first cosmic music album recorded in Spain. Over 40 albums have been released by the Neuronium/Michel Huygen label.

History
Neuronium was founded in 1976. For a brief time after its founding Neuronium was a quintet consisted of a percussionist, bassist, guitarist and two synthetists. The band played psychedelic rock. Later both synthesists (Michel Huygen and Carlos Guirao, who also played guitars) and the guitarist (Albert Giménez) decided to perform music in different style (cosmic music) and recorded album Quasar 2C361. It was released by the label EMI-Harvest in Spain  in 1977. Neuronium's second album Vuelo Químico was inspired by the lyrics of Edgar Allan Poe. Singer Nico (famous for her work with The Velvet Underground) recorded vocal parts of the title track. Album was released in 1978. After that Albert Giménez left the band.

In 1980, Neuronium released the album Digital Dream, with the participance of guitarist Santi Picó on their own label Neuronium Records. Musician and producer Klaus Schulze made a remix of the album free of charge, but Neuronium chose to release their own mix of the album because of the legal restraints.

Neuronium collaborated with Vangelis in 1981. Edited recording of their performance on the Spanish television programme "Musical Express" was released under the titles In London in 1992, Separate Affair in 1996, and In London (Platinum Edition) in 2002.

The Visitor (1981) and Chromium Echoes (1982) were the last albums recorded with Carlos Guirao. At the same time as those two albums were released, solo albums by Michel Huygen (Absence of Reality) and Carlos Guirao (Revelation) were published. Thereafter, Huygen became the only constant member of Neuronium, with occasional collaborations of guitarist Santi Picó. From that time distinction between solo music by Michel Huygen and Neuronium music became formal.

The concept of Neuronium music included visual side. The Spanish artist Tomás C. Gilsanz created cover art for the albums of the band and the pictures that were projected on the back of the stage during live performances of Neuronium. Sometimes Tomás C. Gilsanz was mentioned as non-musical part of Neuronium project

In May 1986, Huygen was inaugurated by Her Majesty Queen Sofia of Spain as the person in charge of the department of electronic music of the Centre of Art Queen Sofía of Madrid.

Albums such as Sybaris (1991), Hydro (2001), Azizi (2002), Sensorial (2004), and Exosomnia (2012) were the milestones of later Neuronium/Huygen production.

The album Hydro (2001) became the best-seller of Huygen's music. More than 150,000 copies were sold worldwide. By 2001, a million copies of Huygen's various records had been sold.

Neuronium Records was created in 2002 as the personal label of Michel Huygen, on which works from other artists, including Suzanne Ciani, Constance Demby, Pascal Languirand, Jonn Serrie, Nadia Sohaei and The Lab, were released.

In some sources, including CD booklets, Neuronium's music is referred to as psychotronic, which purpose is to reach a state of harmony between the body and soul. From a more formal perspective, music by Neuronium covers several electronic music styles, including new-age, ambient, space music, progressive electronic music.

Discography

Albums
(1977): Quasar 2C361 (Neuronium)
(1978): Vuelo Quimico (Neuronium)
(1980): Digital Dream (Neuronium) remastered as The New Digital Dream, with new cover
(1981): The Visitor (Neuronium) remastered as The New Visitor, with new cover
(1982): Chromium Echoes (Neuronium)
(1982): Absence of Reality (Huygen)
(1983): Invisible Views (Neuronium)
(1984): Heritage (Neuronium)
(1984): Capturing holograms (Huygen)
(1986): Barcelona 1992 (Huygen)
(1987): Supranatural (Neuronium)
(1988): From Madrid to Heaven (live) (Neuronium)
(1989): Elixir (Huygen)
(1990): Olim (Neuronium)
(1990): Numerica (Neuronium)
(1990): Intimo (Huygen)
(1991): Extrisimo (Neuronium, including tracks from Huygen's solo works)
(1991): Sybaris (Neuronium)
(1992): En busca del misterio (Huygen)
(1993): Oniria (Neuronium)
(1994): Infinito (Huygen)
(1995): Música para la buena mesa (Huygen) (collection of tracks from other albums by Neuronium and Michel Huygen)
(1995): Sonar (live) (Neuronium)
(1995): Astralia (Huygen)
(1997): Psykya (Neuronium)
(1999): Ultracosmos (Huygen)
(1999): Alienikon (Neuronium)
(2000): Directo al Corazón (Huygen)
(2001): Hydro (Neuronium)
(2002): Placebo (Huygen)
(2002): Azizi ( Neuronium)
(2005): Mystykatea (Neuronium)
(2006): Synapsia (Neuronium)
(2006): Angkor - Extreme Meditation. Vol.1 (Huygen)
(2007): Irawadi - Extreme Meditation. Vol.2 (Huygen)
(2008): Nihilophobia (Neuronium)
(2010): Etykagnostyka (Neuronium)
(2010): Hydro 2. The Deep End (Neuronium)
(2010): Krung Thep - Extreme Meditation Vol.3 (Huygen)
(2012): Exosomnia (Neuronium)
(2014): Nocny Lot. Live Concert in Poland (Neuronium)
(2015): Jamais Vu (Neuronium)
(2017): Lysergic Dream (Neuronium)

Unnumbered titles
 (1987): Alma (Neuronium) (remixes)
 (1993): In London (Neuronium); (recorded in 1981 with Vangelis; remastered and partly rerecorded); also released as A Separate Affair (1996) and In London (Platinum Edition) (2002), with new covers
 (1998): Oniria Neuromance; (CDR) (compilation album)
 (1998): Todos Sus Grabaciones Para Discos EMI/Harvest (1977–1978) (Neuronium) (compilation double album; includes albums Quasar 2C361 and Vuelo Quimico)
 (1999): Droit Au Coeur (Huygen) (compilation album)
 (2000): Caldea Music (this is an album not mentioned on official site; but sure is a recording of Huygen; later parts of the album were remixed, rerecorded and released as Hydro in 2001)
 (2003): Soplo Vital (Huygen) for ANOREXBU, a psychotherapeutic Association of Anorexia, Bulimia and Light addictions;
 (2003): LSD (Cybernium) (collaboration work with Pascal Languirand of Trans-X)
 (2004): Sensorial (Huygen) (includes re-worked version of "Ultracosmos" track under the title "Percepción Cósmica" ("Senso") with guitar playing by Santi Picó)
 (2005): Chilled drive (Huygen) (compilation album)
 (2005): Neuroworld. Vol. 1 (DVD)
 (2007): Hydroworld (DVD)
 (2007): Magic Samui (Huygen) (compilation album, includes one new track "Samui Sunrise")
 (2010): Hypnotika (CD ROM with visuals)
 (2010): Zen Driving (Huygen)
 (2016): Asymetrica (Huygen) (compilation album included with the book "Neurovisions 2")

Singles
(1978): "Vuelo Quimico/Abismo De Terciopelo" (Neuronium)
(1980): "Privilege" (Neuronium)
(1982): "Prelude" (Neuronium)
(1983): "Decision" (Neuronium)

Other
 (1990): Dalí: the endless enigma; one track: "The Great masturbator".
 (1998): Soudscape Gallery 2; one track: "Megaluz".
 (2002): Pascal Languirand. Renaissance; Huygen wrote the music for the track: "Vivre/Sólo Pensando En Tí" (the same song performed in French and Spanish version).
 (2003): Trans-X. The Drag-Matic Album; producer, executive producer.
 (2003): E-Live 1999-2002. Compilation live album. Contains one untitled live track (2002) recorded by Neuronium with Pascal Languirand.

Online releases
 (2006): Mentalia (Huygen) (includes the only track "Senso" from Sensorial album)

Remastered, remixed and partly re-recorded versions:

 (2010): Quasar 2C361/Ultimate Edition (Neuronium)
 (2010): Chromium Echoes/Ultimate Edition (Neuronium)
 (2010): Vuelo Quimico/Ultimate Edition (Neuronium)
 (2010): Digital Dream/Ultimate Edition (Neuronium)
 (2010): Oniria (Neuronium)
 (2011): From Madrid to Heaven (Neuronium)
 (2011): The Visitor/Ultimate Edition (Neuronium)

Singles

 (2013): "Megaluz"
 (2017): "In Your Dimension"

Upcoming works
As the official website claims, the following albums are to be released in the future:

 Kryptyk (Huygen)
 Untitled project with Kitaro
 Neo, an album with The London Symphony Orchestra (music by Neuronium arranged by Stephen Small)

References

External links 

 Official Neuronium Web Site
 Official Neuronium Myspace page
 Neuronium Entry at Discogs.com
 Neuronium Records Entry at Discogs.com
 Neuronium Entry at EEM
 Article about Neuronium history
 Article about collaboration work by Vangelis and Neuronium
 Neuronium and Vangelis at Youtube
 Carlos Guirao Entry at Discogs.com
 Santi Pico Entry at Discogs.com

Spanish electronic music groups
New-age music groups
1976 establishments in Spain
Musical groups established in 1976